Great Bieszczady Loop Road is a common name for an automobile and bicycle tourist route in the Polish part of the Carpathians and Sanocko-Turczańskie Mountains.

The road begins at Lesko.
Sections of the route are as follows: 
Voivodeship road 893: Lesko - Hoczew - Baligród - Cisna
Voivodeship road 897: Cisna - Wetlina - Ustrzyki Górne (with a road to Wołosate )
Voivodeship road 896: Ustrzyki Górne - Smolnik - Czarna - Ustrzyki Dolne,
National road 84: Ustrzyki Dolne - Lesko.

The road offers views of the mountains and connects the villages with historical monuments and tourist attractions. It runs through Ciśniańsko-Wetliński Landscape Park, Bieszczady National Park, San Valley Landscape Park and Nature Park Słonne Mountains.

References

Roads in Poland